Dorothy Tse Hiu-hung (born 1977) is a Hong Kong author and an assistant professor of creative writing at Hong Kong Baptist University.

Writing career
Dorothy Tse writes primarily in Chinese. Her first short story collection, So Black  (《好黑》), was published in 2005. A Dictionary of Two Cities (《雙城辭典》), a novel which she co-authored with Hon Lai-chu (韓麗珠), another Hong Kong writer, was published in 2013. Tse was awarded the 2013 Hong Kong Book Prize for A Dictionary of Two Cities. She had previously won the Hong Kong Biennial Award for Chinese Literature for So Black.  Her literary prizes also include Taiwan's Unitas New Fiction Writers’ Award and the Hong Kong Award for Creative Writing in Chinese. Tse published her first solo novel, in 2020. It was awarded a PEN/Heim Translation Fund Grant and nominated for the Taipei International Book Exhibition Book Price.

Tse's first English short story, "Woman Fish", a surreal story about a man whose wife turns into a fish, appeared in 2013 in The Guardian. Her first full-length book in English, Snow and Shadow, was published in 2014 by Hong Kong publisher Muse. Snow and Shadow is a collection of short stories from her earlier Chinese books, as well as previously unpublished works, all translated by Nicky Harman.

Tse writes in a surrealist style. Her translator Nicky Harman describes her writing as: “surreal tales—fantastic in parts—but made the more effective for being grounded firmly in reality... Dreamscapes interlock with a narrative which, though superficially realistic, itself feels quite unreal.”

Tse is co-founder of the Hong Kong literary magazine Fleurs des lettres and attended The University of Iowa's International Writing Program in 2011.

References

1977 births
Living people
Hong Kong novelists
Hong Kong women writers
Women novelists
International Writing Program alumni